Rolf (Emil Rudolf) Nesch (January 7, 1893 – October 27, 1975) was German born, Norwegian  expressionist artist, especially noted for his printmaking.

Career
Nesch was born at Esslingen am Neckar in Baden-Württemberg, Germany. He was the son of August Nesch (1867–1922) and Emilie Langbein (1869–1944). Nesch grew up in Württemberg. He studied at the State Academy of Fine Arts Stuttgart  (1908–12) and Dresden Academy of Fine Arts (1912–14). 

He participated in World War I  led him to British captivity (1917–19). In the following years, he lived in Dresden, partly in Berlin and in the hometown of Esslingen. In 1929 he settled in Hamburg to continue his artistic career. Nesch worked in parallel with painting and graphics. He was influenced by expressionism in general, especially Ernst Ludwig Kirchner and Edvard Munch.  Upon the Nazi takeover in Germany in 1933, Nesch repatriated to Norway. An established artist in Germany, he found the initial period in Norway to be difficult. After a few years, the situation improved and he found support from, among others, Pola Gauguin and Rolf Stenersen. Nesch became a Norwegian citizen in the fall of 1946.  In 1950, he married actress Ragnhild Hald  (1896-1975) in New York City.

After moving to Norway,  Nesch focused on sculptures besides graphics. Nesch had a large production of art which included  graphics, material images, painting, sculpture and drawings.  Nesch found a suitable medium in  metal pressure technology.  Apart from drawing, which was his natural tool and means of expression throughout, it was printmaking he devoted himself to most continuously and over the greatest number of years. And it is as printmaker that Rolf Nesch made his most significant contribution, not merely as a technical innovator who discovered the potential in new materials and methods, but also from the artistic point of view.

He was appointed a Knight  of the Royal Norwegian Order of St. Olav (1967) and Commander (1973). He was awarded the Prince Eugen Medal (1973).
Nesch died in 1975 in Oslo. The National Gallery of Norway owns eleven material pictures, three sculptures as well as other graphic by Rolf Nesch.  
Nesch-museet opened in 1993 at Ål, where he had lived for twenty-five years.

References

External links
Rolf Nesch Website

Other sources
Helliesen, Sidsel and Bodil Sørensen (2009)  Rolf Nesch: The Complete Graphic Works  (Skira Rizzoli Publishing; Milano)   
Kristiansen, Runar  (1998) Edvard Munch, Nikolai Astrup, Rolf Nesch, Ludvig Eikaas (Skei i Jølster : Jølster kommune)

Further reading
Jan Askeland (1969) The Graphic Art of Rolf Nesch  (Detroit Institute of Arts)  
 Eivind Otto Hjelle (1998) Rolf Nesch (Oslo: Gyldendal) 
Sidsel Helliesen  and Eivind Otto Hjelle (1976) Rolf Nesch på teaterturne til Finnmark, Oslo 
Alfred Hentzen  and Wolf Stubbe (1973)Rolf Nesch. Graphik, Berlin 
Alfred Hentzen (1960) Rolf Nesch. Graphik, Materialbilder, Plastik, Stuttgart  
Max Sauerlandt, Gustav Schiefler and Wolf Stubbe et al., (1977)  Rolf Nesch: Karl Muck og hans orkester, Oslo 
Wolf Stubbe, (1965) Der Zyklus St.Pauli von Rolf Nesch, Jahrbuch der Hamburger Kunstsammlungen 
Wolf Stubbe (1985)  Tiere anders gesehen. Tierzeichnungen von Rolf Nesch, Hamburg 
Eva Wiik (1994) Min venn Rolf Nesch, Oslo

1893 births
1975 deaths
People from Esslingen am Neckar
People from the Kingdom of Württemberg
German Expressionist painters
20th-century German painters
German sculptors
German male sculptors
20th-century sculptors
19th-century sculptors
German emigrants to Norway
Refugees in Norway
Naturalised citizens of Norway
Norwegian sculptors
20th-century Norwegian painters
Norwegian male painters
Emigrants from Nazi Germany
German prisoners of war in World War I
World War I prisoners of war held by the United Kingdom
Recipients of the St. Olav's Medal
Recipients of the Prince Eugen Medal
20th-century German male artists
20th-century Norwegian male artists